Selenicereus undatus, the white-fleshed pitahaya, is a species of the genus Selenicereus (formerly Hylocereus) in the family Cactaceae and is the most cultivated species in the genus. It is used both as an ornamental vine and as a fruit crop - the pitahaya or dragon fruit.

Like all true cacti, the genus originates in the Americas, but the precise native origin of the species S. undatus is uncertain and never been resolved; it may be a hybrid.

Description

Plant 
Dragonfruit stems are scandent (climbing habit), creeping, sprawling or clambering, and branch profusely.

Flowers 

Fruit 

Habitat 
Selenicereus undatus is lithophytic or hemiepiphytic.  It is widely distributed through the tropics in cultivation. It is a sprawling or vining, terrestrial or epiphytic cactus. They climb by use of aerial roots and can reach a height of 10 meters (32.8 feet) or more growing on rocks and trees.

Systematics 
This species is closely related to S. ocamponis and S. escuintlensis. Selenicereus undatus was described by (Haw.) Britton & Rose and published in Flora of Bermuda 256. 1918. In 2017, D. R. Hunt groups the genus Hylocereus within the genus Selenicereus. This has been supported by a phylogenetic analysis of the Hylocereeae tribe (Korotkova, et al., 2017), therefore this species is consigned under the name Selenicereus undatus

Taxonomy 
The species's epithet undatus in Latin means "wavy" from unda "wave", referring to the wavy edges of its branches' ribs.

Common names
Czech: Dračí ovoce
Dansk: Dragefrugt
English: pitahaya, dragon fruit, night blooming cereus, strawberry pear, Belle of the Night, Cinderella plant, Jesus in the cradle, moonflower
Estonian: maasik-metskaktus
Finnish: 
French: pitaya, fruit du dragon, cierge-lézard, poire de chardon
German: Drachenfrucht, Distelbirne
Greek: Φρούτο του δράκου
Hawaiian: panini-o-ka-puna-hou ("Punahou cactus") – a famous specimen still grows at Punahou School
Korean: Yong-gwa (용과, 龍果, literal translation of dragon fruit),
Portuguese: pitaia, cato-barse, cardo-ananaz, rainha da noite
Spanish: pitahaya roja (Costa Rica, Colombia, Mexico, Venezuela); flor de caliz, pitajava (Puerto Rico); junco, junco tapatio, pitahaya orejona, reina de la noche, tasajo (Mexico)
Swedish: skogskaktus, röd pitahaya
Vietnamese: thanh long
Thai: แก้วมังกร (kaeo mangkon)
Malay: buah naga. pronounce:boo-ah naa-gaa
Malayalam: വ്യാളീഫലം. 

Italian: Pitahaya, Frutto del Drago
Bengali: ড্রাগন ফল (dragon fal)
Lithuanian: 
Myanmar: နဂါးမောက်သီး

See also 
Pitahaya
List of culinary fruits

References

External links 

 Dragon fruit plant grower's tips, greenhouse, flower and more 

undatus
Cacti of Mexico
Tropical fruit
Desert fruits
Flora of Central America
Crops originating from Mexico
Crops originating from the Americas
Garden plants of North America
Drought-tolerant plants
Night-blooming plants
Epiphytes